Archibald Maxwell Gubbrud (December 31, 1910 – April 26, 1987) was an American politician who served as the 22nd Governor of South Dakota.

Early life
Gubbrud was born in Norway Township in Lincoln County, South Dakota.  He was one of four children born to Torval Marius and Ella (Rommeriam) Gubbrud. From 1911 to 1914, Gubbrud's grandfather Andrew Rommeriam had served in the South Dakota House of Representatives and had been a friend of South Dakota governor Peter Norbeck.  In 1929, Gubbrud graduated from Augustana Academy in Canton, South Dakota. After the death of his father in 1934, Gubbrud became responsible for the Gubbrud family farm and was quite successful at farming.  He married Florence Dexter and they had two children.

Career
His political career started that same year when he became Norway Township clerk.  From 1947 to 1952, Gubbrud served as chairman of Elmwood School.  In 1948, he was the Lincoln County delegate to the South Dakota state Republican convention.  In 1950, Gubbrud was elected to the South Dakota House of Representatives.  In 1951, he won the Mississippi Valley Association Soil Conservation Award for South Dakota.  He served as Speaker of the South Dakota House of Representatives from 1959 to 1961, and was also the Chairman of the Legislative Research Council Executive Board at the same time.

In 1960, Gubbrud ran for Governor of South Dakota, beating the incumbent, Ralph Herseth, by only 4,435 votes. In 1962, Gubbrud was elected for a second term when he beat Ralph Herseth by 31,000 votes. During his tenure he doubled aid to education.  The Custer State Hospital and state budget office were also started with his recommendation.  In 1965, Gubbrud left office and returned to the Gubbrud family farm seven and a half miles northeast of Alcester, South Dakota. In 1968, Gubbrud reluctantly ran for the office of United States Senator after being urged to do so by the Republicans but was beat by the incumbent, Senator George McGovern.

In 1969, President Richard Nixon appointed Gubbrud as state director of the Farmers Home Administration; he held that position until 1977.

Death
Gubbrud returned to the Gubbrud farm and remained there until the time of his death from lung cancer; he died at McKennan Hospital in Sioux Falls, South Dakota, aged 76. He was interred in Lands Lutheran Church cemetery.

References

External links
 Sobel, Robert, and John Raimo, eds. Biographical Directory of the Governors of the United States, 1789-1978, Vol. 3 (Westport, Conn.; Meckler Books, 4 vols. 1978)

1910 births
1987 deaths
American Lutherans
Republican Party governors of South Dakota
Deaths from lung cancer
American people of Norwegian descent
Deaths from cancer in South Dakota
People from Lincoln County, South Dakota
Farmers from South Dakota
Speakers of the South Dakota House of Representatives
Republican Party members of the South Dakota House of Representatives
20th-century American businesspeople
20th-century American politicians
20th-century Lutherans